George (Syriac Giwargi; died 724) was the Syriac Orthodox bishop of the Arabs around Aleppo and the upper Euphrates from 686 or 687 until his death. A polymath steeped in ancient Greek philosophy, his writings are an important source for Syriac history and theology.

George was born in the vicinity of Antioch around 640 or 660. His native language was Syriac, but he learned Greek and perhaps Arabic. He began his education as a small child with a periodeut named Gabriel. He became associated with the monastery of Qenneshre, where he studied under Severus Sebokht and may have acquired Greek. He was a disciple of Patriarch Athanasius II of Antioch and a personal friend of Jacob of Edessa and John of Litharb. Shortly before his death, Athanasius ordered Bishop Sargis Zakunoyo to ordain George as bishop of the Arab nations. This took place in November 686 or 687. The nations or tribes that George served as bishop were the Tanukāyē, Ṭūʿāyē and ʿAqulāyē. They were generally bilingual in Syriac and Arabic. The heartlands of these tribes and thus George's diocese lay in northern Syria and Upper Mesopotamia. His seat was at ʿAqula. He died in 724.

George wrote on a variety of topics, but his most important works are his translations of Aristotle from Greek into Syriac. He translated—or revised earlier translations of—the Categories, On Interpretation and the first two books of the Prior Analytics, adding original introductions to each. He completed the seventh and final book of Jacob of Edessa's encyclopaedic Hexaemeron, a treatise on the six days of Creation, after Jacob's death in 708. He also wrote a commentary on the West Syriac liturgy for baptism and communion, and scholia (explanatory notes) to the orations of Gregory of Nazianzus. Among the poems attributed to him are a sermon on the life of Severus of Antioch and treatises on the monastic life, Palm Sunday, the Forty Martyrs of Sebaste and funeral services for bishops. The poem Myron has been attributed to him, but also to Jacob of Serug. Eleven of George's letters are preserved. They deal with matters of philosophy, astronomy, theology, literary criticism, liturgy and asceticism. They are an important source for the early development of Islamic kalām (philosophical theology). The nomocanon of Bar Hebraeus attributes to George the ruling that "a priest or a deacon who
gives the Eucharist to the heretics shall be deposed".

George was celebrated as a saint by the Maronites, who kept his feast on Saint George's Day (23 April). The Syriac Orthodox patriarch Ignatius Aphrem I gave him the honorific mar, but there is no record of his being treated as saint otherwise.

Editions of works

Notes

Bibliography

7th-century births
724 deaths
Syriac writers
7th-century Syriac Orthodox Church bishops
8th-century Syriac Orthodox Church bishops
7th-century philosophers
8th-century philosophers